Molten rock can refer to:

Lava, molten rock expelled by a volcano during an eruption
Magma, hot semifluid material found beneath the surface of Earth